Nadra Bank was one of the largest commercial bank in Ukraine. It was founded in October 1993, and had its headquarters in Kyiv. The Bank ranked among the largest banks in its category according to the classification of the National Bank of Ukraine and operated a network of 543 outlets throughout Ukraine.

Nadra Bank was one of the three of top-20 Ukrainian banks which went into receivership during the downturn of 2008–09. Temporary administration at Nadra Bank (introduced in February 2009), was withdrawn in August 2011 with a new strategic investor, Dmytro Firtash, acquiring an 89.97% stake and injecting ₴ 3.5bn ($440m) of capital. The government did not participate in recapitalizing Nadra.

The bank was declared insolvent in February 2015. On 4 June 2015 the National Bank of Ukraine revoked its banking license and liquidated the bank.

See also 

List of banks in Ukraine

References

External links
 Official website 

Defunct banks of Ukraine
Ukrainian companies established in 1993
Banks established in 1993
Banks disestablished in 2015
2015 disestablishments in Ukraine